Tăura Veche is a commune in Sîngerei District, Moldova. It is composed of two villages, Tăura Nouă and Tăura Veche.

References

Communes of Sîngerei District